Cedar Mill Park is a  park in the Cedar Mill neighborhood, in the Portland, Oregon metropolitan area.

The park was closed for improvements in June 2014, reopening in November.

References

External links

 

Parks in Washington County, Oregon